Hotel Paris is a historic residential building on the Upper West Side of Manhattan in New York City.

History
The building was completed in 1931. It was designed in the Art Deco architectural style.

The building was acquired by Westbrook Partners for US$85.8 million in 2007. Three years later, in 2010, it was acquired by investor David Bistricer and the Rieder family for US$72.36 million. They sold it to Crescent Heights for $123 million in 2013. The company refurbished the apartments. In 2015, Bruce Menin of Crescent Heights sold it to Laurence Gluck of Stellar Management for US$150 million.

There are 175 apartments, a gym and a swimming-pool.

See also
 Art Deco architecture of New York City

References

External links

Art Deco architecture in Manhattan
Residential buildings completed in 1931
Residential buildings in Manhattan
Upper West Side
West End Avenue